...Burn, Piano Island, Burn is the third full-length studio album by the American post-hardcore band The Blood Brothers, released in March 2003. Produced by Ross Robinson, the album was recorded over two months with a roughly $25,000 budget. The album drew widespread critical acclaim, reflected by an average score 82 on Metacritic.

To promote the album, "Ambulance vs. Ambulance" was released as a single and had a music video produced for it. In 2009, Epitaph Records reissued the album including bonus tracks as well as the Jungle Rules Live DVD packaged with the CD edition.

Track listing

Personnel
The Blood Brothers
 Jordan Blilie – vocals
 Mark Gajadhar – drums
 Morgan Henderson – bass, Nord II, piano, G4, vocals
 Cody Votolato – guitar, tractor, vocals
 Johnny Whitney – vocals, guitar on "Salesman, Denver Max", Wurlitzer piano, Glockenspiel, Lawnmower

 Lenny Castro - percussion
 Chava Mirel, Amy, Carrie – backing vocals

Production and design
 Ross Robinson – Producer
 The Blood Brothers – Co-Producer
 Mike Fraser – Engineer, Mixer
 Mike Terry – Engineer, Pro Tools
 George Marino – Mastering
 Yaeger Rosenberg – Layout Concept and Design
 Cody Votolato – Layout Concept and Design
 Johnny Whitney – Layout Concept and Design
 Kirk Huffman – Cursive/Flakiness
 Sean McGahan – Bluest/Love

Vinyl information
1st pressing:
 500 on 180 gram vinyl.
2nd pressing:
 200 on red vinyl with red labels (only sold by the band).
3rd pressing:
 378 on white vinyl.
4th pressing:
 819 on blue/white swirl vinyl.
5th pressing: 1024 copies
 505 on clear vinyl.
 519 on opaque light green vinyl.
6th pressing: 1604 copies
 528 on light blue vinyl.
 524 on pink vinyl.
 552 on half pink/half blue "cotton candy" vinyl.
7th pressing:
 200 on screen-printed 2 x LP.
8th pressing: 
265 Translucent Red w/ Translucent Orange & Black Splatter 
265 Opaque Yellow w/ Red & Black Speckles
9th pressing:
490 Grey/Red/Black Marble 
10th pressing:
524 Yellow 
524 Orange

References

The Blood Brothers (band) albums
2003 albums
V2 Records albums
Albums produced by Ross Robinson